Hilbert's eighteenth problem is one of the 23 Hilbert problems set out in a celebrated list compiled in 1900 by mathematician David Hilbert.  It asks three separate questions about lattices and sphere packing in Euclidean space.

Symmetry groups in  dimensions
The first part of the problem asks whether there are only finitely many essentially different space groups in -dimensional Euclidean space.  This was answered affirmatively by Bieberbach.

Anisohedral tiling in 3 dimensions
The second part of the problem asks whether there exists a polyhedron which tiles 3-dimensional Euclidean space but is not the fundamental region of any space group; that is, which tiles but does not admit an isohedral (tile-transitive) tiling.  Such tiles are now known as anisohedral.  In asking the problem in three dimensions, Hilbert was probably assuming that no such tile exists in two dimensions; this assumption later turned out to be incorrect.

The first such tile in three dimensions was found by Karl Reinhardt in 1928.  The first example in two dimensions was found by Heesch in 1935. The related einstein problem asks for a shape that can tile space but not with an infinite cyclic group of symmetries.

Sphere packing
The third part of the problem asks for the densest sphere packing or packing of other specified shapes.  Although it expressly includes shapes other than spheres, it is generally taken as equivalent to the Kepler conjecture.

In 1998, American mathematician Thomas Callister Hales gave a computer-aided proof of the Kepler conjecture. It shows that the most space-efficient way to pack spheres is in a pyramid shape.

References

18
Tessellation